Phillip Christou (born  in Williamstown, Victoria) is an Australian male weightlifter, competing in the 94 kg category and representing Australia at international competitions.

Career
As a junior, coached by Michael Noonan, he won the silver medal at the national championships in 1984. Christou won the bronze medal in the  snatch at the 1994 Commonwealth Games in Victoria, Canada. lifting 152.5 kg. He competed at world championships, most recently at the 1998 World Weightlifting Championships.

Personal
Christou is married with Lexi Christou, and has had two children.

Major competitions

References

1970 births
Living people
Australian male weightlifters
Weightlifters at the 1994 Commonwealth Games
Commonwealth Games medallists in weightlifting
Commonwealth Games bronze medallists for Australia
People from Williamstown, Victoria
20th-century Australian people
21st-century Australian people
Medallists at the 1994 Commonwealth Games